María Concepción Enma Iranzo Martín (born 1 February 1959) is a pharmaceutical biochemist and Spanish politician.

Education
She earned her degree in Pharmaceutical Biochemistry from the Complutense University of Madrid in 1982.
She has a PhD in Biochemistry and Clinical Toxicology, Metabolic Regulation, Environmental contaminants and biochemical effects, Neurochemistry and Experimental Hematology.
In February 1985 she studied at the US Oak Ridge National Laboratory.

Jobs in Chemistry

Margin was a researcher at the Centre for Energy Environment and Technology, (1982-1985), a Member of the Nuclear Energy Board (1989-1991) and Coordinatora for the Internal Dosimetry Group of the Spanish Society for Radiological Protection.

Politics

In politics, she worked for the Partido Popular (PP) and was alcadesa and councillor in Requena for 9 years (1995-2003). She held various positions in Valencia as President of the Valencian Federation of Municipalities and Provinces (FVMP), (1999-2003), Director General of Irrigation and Agricultural Infrastructure (1999-2003), Executive member of the provincial People's Party, Regional board member and secretary of local politics and deputy member of the Corts Valencianes Parliament of Valencia, during the Elections to the Corts Valencianes, 2007 and Elections to the Corts Valencianes, 2011,(2007-2011).

References

1959 births
Living people
Politicians from Madrid
People's Party (Spain) politicians
Members of the 7th Corts Valencianes
Members of the 8th Corts Valencianes